Diapheromera arizonensis, the Arizona walkingstick, is a species of walkingstick in the family Diapheromeridae. It is found in North America.

References

Further reading

External links

 

Phasmatodea
Insects described in 1903